Columbia Mutual Insurance Company is the parent company of a group of five property and casualty insurance companies operating as the Columbia Insurance Group.  The group of companies primarily focus on insuring businesses but, also, insure farms, homes and cars.  The company is licensed in 30 states, with policyholders in 19 states.  Columbia Insurance Group exclusively markets its insurance products through the independent insurance agency system.  The corporate headquarters is in Columbia, Missouri.  The company has branch offices in Austin, Texas, Atlanta, Georgia, Omaha, Nebraska, and Salina, Kansas.

The five entities operating as the Columbia Insurance Group are: Association Casualty Insurance Company, Citizens Mutual Insurance Company, Columbia Mutual Insurance Company, Columbia National Insurance Company, and Georgia Casualty & Surety Company.

References
Columbia REDI spotlight on CIG

External links
Columbia Insurance Group Homepage

Financial services companies established in 1874
Insurance companies of the United States
Companies based in Columbia, Missouri